Benjamin Bilse (17 August 1816 – 13 July 1902) was a German conductor and composer.

Bilse was born in Liegnitz (present-day Legnica) in the Prussian Silesia Province. He obtained a rich musical education, as at the Vienna Conservatory under violinist Joseph Böhm, and played in the orchestra of Johann Strauss I. Returned to Liegnitz, he became municipal Kapellmeister in 1842.

From 1867 he regularly performed with the "Bilse's Band" (Bilse'sche Kapelle) at the Concerthaus on Leipziger Straße in Berlin. The orchestra became increasingly popular, Bilse toured Europe and gave guest concerts in Saint Petersburg, Riga, Warsaw, Amsterdam, Vienna, as well as at the 1867 Exposition Universelle in Paris, where his band performed The Blue Danube together with Johann Strauss II. In 1873 Richard Wagner conducted the orchestra in the presence of Emperor Wilhelm I.

After a fierce quarrel with Bilse about another fourth-class concert trip to Warsaw, 54 musicians in 1882 split to found the "Former Bilse's Band" under conductor Ludwig von Brenner, shortly afterwards renamed Berlin Philharmonic, today one of the world's leading orchestras. Bilse retired a few years later and returned to Liegnitz, where he also died.

See also
Joachim Andersen
Eugène Ysaÿe

External links
 

German composers
German conductors (music)
German male conductors (music)
1816 births
1902 deaths
19th-century German musicians
19th-century German male musicians